Ronnie Båthman (born 24 April 1959) is a former professional tennis player from Sweden. He enjoyed most of his tennis success while playing doubles.  During his career, he won three doubles titles and finished as a runner-up four times. He achieved a career-high doubles ranking of world No. 38 in 1992.

Career finals

Doubles (3 wins, 4 losses)

External links
 
 

Swedish male tennis players
Living people
1959 births
20th-century Swedish people